Marcus Jonas Munuhe Olsson (born 17 May 1988) is a Swedish professional footballer who plays as a midfielder and a left-back for Halmstad.

Club career

Halmstads BK
Born in Gävle, Sweden, Olsson started his career at Högaborgs BK. In 2008, he signed a contract with Halmstad, replacing Martin Fribrock as left winger as Fribrock departed for Esbjerg fB in the summer of 2008. Mainly featured as left winger, he also used as a forward in several games, during Josep Clotet Ruiz time at Halmstad and the lack of a natural left side defender, Olsson and Kujtim Bala took turns on playing on the position. As Halmstads BK was relegated from Allsvenskan in 2011, Marcus announced that he would not sign a new contract with the club and that he would start searching for a new club to play for.

Blackburn Rovers
After rejecting a contract from Djurgårdens IF, and being linked to Standard Liège and Viking FK, Blackburn Rovers confirmed on 31 January that Olsson had signed a two-and-a-half-year contract with the club, joining his twin brother there.

Marcus Olsson made his debut for Blackburn Rovers in the 3–0 away defeat to Manchester City in the Premier League on 25 February 2012, playing on the left wing, in front of his twin Martin who played at left back, with both completing a full 90 minutes. He scored his first goal for Blackburn in a 3–3 draw with Leeds United on 1 September 2012.

Olsson was released by Rovers following the conclusion of his contract with the club on 1 July 2014, but after lengthy negotiations signed a new contract for the club on 11 July.

He was voted Blackburn Rovers player of the season for the 2014–15 season.

Derby County
On 26 January 2016, Olsson was transferred from Blackburn to Derby County for an undisclosed fee, signing a three-and-a-half year contract.

Olsson played his full debut on 6 February 2016 against Fulham, scoring an own goal after 17 minutes. He scored his first goal for the club in a 1–0 win over Nottingham Forest on 19 March 2016.

He was released by Derby County at the end of the 2018–19 season.

Return to Halmstads BK
Olsson missed most of the 2020 season and all of 2021 season due to cruciate ligament injury. Upon recovering, on 28 January 2022 he returned to Halmstad.

International career
Marcus Olsson was called up to the annual January tour of the Sweden national team in 2012, facing Bahrain and Qatar U23. He made his national team debut against Bahrain when he came on as a substitute for Tobias Hysén at half-time, he made his second appearance against Qatar in the following match, again coming on as a substitute at half-time, this time replacing Jiloan Hamad.

Personal life
His twin brother Martin Olsson is also a professional footballer and plays for Malmö FF. Their brother-in-law is former Dallas Mavericks basketball player Dirk Nowitzki, who married their older sister Jessica.

Career statistics

Club

References

External links

HBK Profile 

1988 births
Living people
People from Gävle
Swedish footballers
Sweden international footballers
Sweden under-21 international footballers
Association football midfielders
Swedish twins
Halmstads BK players
Blackburn Rovers F.C. players
Derby County F.C. players
Allsvenskan players
Premier League players
English Football League players
Swedish expatriate footballers
Swedish expatriate sportspeople in the United Kingdom
Twin sportspeople
Swedish people of Kenyan descent
Swedish sportspeople of African descent
Expatriate footballers in England
Högaborgs BK players
Sportspeople from Gävleborg County